Niklas Åke Wykman (born 10 March 1981) is a Swedish politician of the Moderate Party. He has served as Minister for Financial Markets in the cabinet of Ulf Kristersson since October 2022 and has been Member of the Riksdag since the 2014 general election, representing Stockholm County. He was chairman of the Moderate Youth League, the youth wing of the Moderate Party, from 2006 to 2010.

Career 
Wykman joined the Moderate Youth League in 1997 and was also chairman of the Moderate School Youth from 2000 to 2001. He was elected new chairman of the Moderate Youth League at its congress in Sollentuna on 25 November 2006, winning over the election committee's candidate Mattias Thorsson with the votes 63–49.

Until being elected chairman of the Moderate Youth League, Wykman was a student of mathematical statistics at Stockholm University and worked as a team leader at a call centre. During the 2003 referendum on Sweden adopting the Euro as their currency Wykman worked for the center-right No-campaign Medborgare mot EMU.

Controversial statements 
After the boarding of the Free Gaza Movements "Freedom Flotilla" by Israeli troops in June 2010, Niklas Wykman declared on his Facebook webpage that "I feel eased now when Hamas does not receive the visits they had expected. It is a victory for the whole of Gaza! [The Swedish] Ship to Gaza are useful idiots, terrorists, and ideologically driven aiming to genocide Israel" The statements received strong criticism from representatives from most political parties, including Swedish prime minister Fredrik Reinfeldt, who recognized the humanitarian aspects of the solidarity movement.

References

|-

|-

|-
 
|-

 

|-

1981 births
21st-century Swedish politicians
Living people
Members of the Riksdag 2014–2018
Members of the Riksdag 2018–2022
Members of the Riksdag 2022–2026
Members of the Riksdag from the Moderate Party
People from Kalmar
Stockholm University alumni
Swedish bloggers
Swedish Ministers for Finance